Hector Daniel Lang (born April 3, 1948) is a Canadian former politician, who was a Conservative member of the Senate of Canada from 2009 to 2017. He was appointed on the advice of Stephen Harper to the Senate on January 2, 2009.

Political career
He was previously a Progressive Conservative member of the Yukon Legislative Assembly, representing the electoral district of Whitehorse Porter Creek East from 1978 to 1992. Prior to the creation of the legislative assembly in 1978, he served a term on the non-partisan Yukon Territorial Council from 1974 to 1978 in the district of Whitehorse Porter Creek.

His brother Archie Lang was a cabinet minister in the Yukon prior to retiring from politics in 2011.

Lang was eligible to remain in the Senate until his 75th birthday in 2023 but in 2017 he announced that he was retiring early from the Senate in order to spend more time with his family.

References

External links
 

Living people
1948 births
Canadian senators from Yukon
Conservative Party of Canada senators
People from Dawson Creek
Yukon Party MLAs
Politicians from Whitehorse
Members of the Yukon Territorial Council
21st-century Canadian politicians